is a passenger railway station in the city of Funabashi, Chiba Prefecture, Japan, operated by the private railway operator Keisei Electric Railway.The station name refers to the nearby Funabashi Racecourse.

Lines
Funabashikeibajō Station is served by the Keisei Main Line, and is located 27.2 km from the terminus of the line at Keisei Ueno Station.

Station layout
The station consists of two island platforms connected by a footbridge to the elevated station building.

Platforms

History
It was renamed  on 18 November 1931, becoming  on 5 July 1950, and then  on 1 December 1963. The station was renamed Funabashikeibajō Station on 1 April 1987.

Station numbering was introduced to all Keisei Line stations on 17 July 2010. Funabashikeibajō was assigned station number KS24.

Passenger statistics
In fiscal 2019, the station was used by an average of 20,709 passengers daily.

Surrounding area

 Funabashi Racecourse
 LaLaport Tokyo Bay shopping mall

See also
 List of railway stations in Japan

References

External links

  

Railway stations in Japan opened in 1927
Railway stations in Chiba Prefecture
Keisei Main Line
Funabashi